Michelle Belegrin is an American actress and model, who starred as Andrea Zavatti on the MyNetworkTV serial Desire.   She has also modeled, standing at 5 feet 7½ inches tall, for Marie Claire, ELLE and Fashion Quarterly. She appeared in the 2009 film, Blood and Bone, starring Michael Jai White.

Personal
Belegrin has lived all over California from Sacramento to Los Angeles. She obtained a degree from the University of California Santa Barbara.

Appearances
At the start of her career, Belegrin did several commercials for Honda, Panasonic and Bally's Total Fitness. She has appeared in many television series and movies, including CSI: Miami, CSI: Crime Scene Investigation, Kitchen Confidential, Fistful of Diamonds, Project Solitude, Potheads: The Movie, Red 71 and Blood and Bone.

References

External links

American television actresses
American film actresses
Female models from California
American telenovela actresses
Year of birth missing (living people)
Living people
21st-century American women